Airbourne or Air Borne may refer to:
 Air Bourne, a finishing move and the nickname of professional wrestler Evan Bourne
 Airbourne (air show), an air show in Eastbourne, United Kingdom
 Airbourne (band), an Australian hard rock band

See also
 Airborne (disambiguation)